James Tench Ennis (27 February 1900 in County Dublin – 15 October 1976 in Dublin) was an Irish cricketer.

A right-handed batsman, he played one first-class match for Dublin University, against Northamptonshire in June 1926 and was dismissed for a duck in both innings by England test cricketer Nobby Clark.

He was later an unsuccessful candidate for Dáil Éireann in the Dublin County constituency, standing for Cumann na nGaedheal at the 1932, 1933 general elections and for Fine Gael at the 1937 general elections.

References

1900 births
1976 deaths
Irish cricketers
Dublin University cricketers
Politicians from County Dublin
Cricketers from County Dublin